Our Lady of Victory Academy was a private, all-girls, Roman Catholic high school in Dobbs Ferry, New York.

Our Lady of Victory Academy was established in 1961 by the Sisters of Mercy, who had established Mercy College on the same site in 1960.

It was dedicated to preparing young women to take their full place in church and society by providing quality secondary education in fidelity to the Gospel, Catholic tradition, and the Mercy charism. The school closed in June 2011 after experiencing increasing financial deficits. The facility was taken over by Mercy College, which had previously shared the use of the building and campus utility system.

Notes and references

Defunct Catholic secondary schools in New York (state)
Educational institutions established in 1961
Educational institutions disestablished in 2011
Girls' schools in New York (state)
Private high schools in Westchester County, New York
1961 establishments in New York (state)
Sanguinet & Staats buildings